The following outline is provided as an overview of and topical guide to physiology:

Physiology – scientific study of the normal function in living systems. A branch of biology, its focus is in how organisms, organ systems, organs, cells, and biomolecules carry out the chemical or physical functions that exist in a living system.

What type of thing is physiology? 

Physiology can be described as all of the following:
 An academic discipline
 A branch of science
 A branch of biology

Branches of physiology 
By approach
 Applied physiology
 Clinical physiology
 Exercise physiology
 Nutrition physiology
 Comparative physiology
 Mathematical physiology
 Yoga physiology
By organism
 Animal physiology
 Mammal physiology
 Human physiology
 Fish physiology
 Insect physiology
 Plant physiology
By process
 Developmental physiology
 Ecophysiology
 Evolutionary physiology
By subsystem
 Cardiovascular physiology
 Renal physiology
 Defense physiology
 Gastrointestinal physiology
 Musculoskeletal physiology
 Neurophysiology
 Respiratory physiology

History of physiology 

History of physiology

General physiology concepts

Physiology organizations 
 American Physiological Society
 International Union of Physiological Sciences

Physiology publications 
 American Journal of Physiology
 Experimental Physiology
 Journal of Applied Physiology

Persons influential in physiology 
 List of Nobel laureates in Physiology or Medicine
 List of physiologists

See also 
 Outline of biology

References

External links 

 The Physiological Society
 physiologyINFO.org public information site sponsored by The American Physiological Society

Physiology
Physiology